Grande Ronde Hospital provides medical services in La Grande, Oregon, United States. Founded and opened in 1907 and re-opened at a new location in 1966, the non-profit hospital offers inpatient care as well as a broad range of diagnostic, surgical, and therapeutic outpatient services. It has a family birthing center and provides home-care and hospice services.

More than 700 people work at Grande Ronde Hospital. It is accredited by The Joint Commission (TJC) and is a member of the American Small Hospital Association.

See also
List of hospitals in Oregon

References

 

Hospital buildings completed in 1907
Hospital buildings completed in 1966
Hospitals in Oregon
Hospitals established in 1907
La Grande, Oregon
Buildings and structures in Union County, Oregon
1907 establishments in Oregon